Douchebag may refer to:

 A device used to administer a douche
 A pejorative term for an arrogant or obnoxious person
 Douchebag (film), a 2010 film directed by Drake Doremus

2000s slang
2010s slang